Madeleine Cormier, known as Manon Cormier (born 27 August 1896, Bordeaux, France; died 25 May 1945, Paris, France ), was a lawyer and feminist writer. Active and activist, Manon Cormier undertakes a doctorate of Law at the Faculty of Bordeaux, and in parallel engages in many associations. She was the president of the Bordeaux Students' Association, a member of charities, such as the French Red Cross, involved in the Women's Liberation Movement as founder and president of the Gironde section of the French League for Women's Rights, founder of the Soroptimist Club of Bordeaux.

References

1896 births
Writers from Bordeaux
1945 deaths
French feminist writers
20th-century French women lawyers
20th-century French lawyers